They're All Gonna Laugh at You! is the debut album by American actor and comedian Adam Sandler, released in 1993. The title comes from a repeated line in the track "Oh Mom...", which is itself a parody of a scene in the film Carrie. Several of the tracks on the album feature very adult humor, a departure from the material in his films, which are generally rated PG or PG-13. This is a trend that would continue on his subsequent comedy albums and live tours.

In late 2022, the song "At a Medium Pace" received mild internet attention on sites such as TikTok and YouTube, due to a sped-up version of the song sounding like a member of Alvin and the Chipmunks.

Production
At the time of the recording, Adam Sandler was in the middle of his five-season career at Saturday Night Live and much of this album was made with the help of his friends from the show. Besides Sandler, the album features fellow SNL performers Rob Schneider, David Spade, Chris Farley, and Tim Meadows, as well as SNL writers Conan O'Brien, Robert Smigel, and career writing partner Tim Herlihy. The album was also produced by G.E. Smith, SNL's musical director at the time. Several friends of Sandler's also perform and co-write on the album, some of whom would go on to become recurring players in Sandler's films, most notably Allen Covert.

In addition to several non-musical skits, the album includes five songs, two of which were performed live (and previously were performed on SNL: "The Thanksgiving Song" and "Lunchlady Land") at The Strand in Redondo Beach, California on July 25, 1993., while "Food Innuendo Guy" is an uptempo George Thorogood meets Aerosmith-influenced blues rocker, "At a Medium Pace" is a sexually explicit love song, and "My Little Chicken" is a jazzy humorous number, in which Sandler sings about his love for chickens.

Reception

The album was nominated for Best Comedy Album at the 37th Annual Grammy Awards. It has been certified 2× platinum, having sold over two million copies.

As of 2014, sales in the United States have exceeded 1,831,000 copies, according to Nielsen SoundScan.

Track listing
All written by Adam Sandler, unless otherwise noted.

"Assistant Principal's Big Day" (Sandler/Tim Herlihy/Rob Schneider) – 2:20
"The Buffoon and the Dean of Admissions" (Sandler/Herlihy) – 2:16
"Buddy" (Sandler/Schneider) – 2:12
"The Longest Pee" (Sandler/Schneider) – 2:15
"Food Innuendo Guy" (Sandler/Jon Rosenberg) – 2:24
"The Beating of a High School Janitor" – 0:31
"Right Field" (Sandler/F. Wolf/H. Busgang/D. McGrath) – 3:11
"The Buffoon and the Valedictorian" (Sandler/Herlihy) – 2:16
"Mr. Spindel's Phone Call" (Sandler/Robert Smigel) – 2:01
"The Thanksgiving Song" (Sandler/Smigel/Ian Maxtone-Graham) – 3:46
"The Beating of a High School Bus Driver" (Sandler/Koren) – 0:57
"Oh Mom..." (Sandler/Schneider) – 2:08
"Fatty McGee" (Sandler/Spade/Meadows)– 3:12
"At a Medium Pace" (Sandler/Koren/Smigel) – 3:16
"The Beating of a High School Science Teacher" – 0:50
"The Cheerleader" (Sandler/Schneider) – 1:34
"I'm So Wasted" (Sandler/Schneider) – 5:00
"Lunchlady Land" (Sandler/Bob Odenkirk/Allen Covert/Herlihy) – 5:01
"The Beating of a High School Spanish Teacher" – 0:28
"Toll Booth Willie" (Koren/Sandler) – 3:47
"Teenage Love on the Phone" – 2:32
"My Little Chicken" (Sandler/Schneider) – 2:15

Tracks 5, 10, 14, 18 and 22 are songs.

Personnel
Adam Sandler – writer/performer
Allen Covert – writer/performer
Rob Schneider – writer/performer
Robert Smigel – writer/performer
Tim Herlihy – writer/performer
Tim Meadows – performer
David Spade – performer
Chris Farley – performer
Andrew Leeds – performer
Conan O'Brien – performer
Jennifer Lien – performer
Meghan Andrews – performer
Margaret Ruden – performer
Brooks Arthur – producer
G.E. Smith – musical director
Elmo Weber – sound effect engineer
Frank Nadasdy – engineer
Gabe Veltri – engineer, mixing
Peter Elia – assistant engineer

Charts

Weekly charts

Songs chart positions

Certifications

Notes

1993 debut albums
Adam Sandler albums
Warner Records albums
Albums produced by Brooks Arthur
1990s comedy albums